Battle Hymns is the debut studio album by American heavy metal band Manowar, released in 1982 on Liberty Records.

Track listing 
All songs by Ross the Boss and Joey DeMaio, except where indicated

Personnel

Manowar
Eric Adams – vocals
Ross the Boss – guitars, keyboards
Joey DeMaio – bass, bass pedals
Donnie Hamzik – drums, percussion

Additional personnel
Orson Welles – narration on "Dark Avenger"

Production
mixed by Jon Mathias at Record Plant Studios, New York City
Joey DeMaio, Ross the Boss – producer
Joe Foglia – engineer
Jim Sessody, John Agnello – assistant engineers 
Joe Breschio – mastering
Bob Currie – executive producer
Aucoin Management, Inc. – management 
Bill Burks, Brian J. Ames – art direction
Gary Ruddell – Illustration

Cover versions 
 Thrash metal band Overkill covered the song "Death Tone" on their 1999 album Coverkill.
 Traditional metal band Seven Witches covered the song "Metal Daze" on their 1999 album Second War in Heaven.
 The song "Battle Hymn" has been covered by German heavy metal band Majesty
 Swiss Heavy Metal band Burning Witches covered the song "Battle Hymn" on their 2020 album Dance With The Devil.
 German band Tankard covered "Fast Taker" on the re-release of their album Disco Destroyer.
 American traditional metal band Slough Feg covered "Fast Taker" on a split single with Solstice.

2010 re-recording – Battle Hymns MMXI

In late 2010 it was announced that Manowar were to rerecord Battle Hymns for a November 26 release. The album, Battle Hymns MMXI, was drummer Donnie Hamzik's first studio recording with Manowar since the original 1982 Battle Hymns release. Orson Welles having died 25 years before, the narration during "Dark Avenger" was recorded by Sir Christopher Lee.

References

External links 
 Lyrics at Genius.com
 Official artist website

1982 debut albums
Manowar albums
Liberty Records albums